Ronald Drayton Brown AM FAA (14 October 1927 – 2 November 2008) was an Australian chemist and academic.  In 1959 he was appointed to the Foundation Chair of Chemistry at Monash University where he remained head of the Department until 1992.  He was elected a Fellow of the Australian Academy of Science in 1965 and appointed a Member of the Order of Australia in 2002.

References

Fellows of the Australian Academy of Science
1927 births
2008 deaths
Australian chemists
Members of the Order of Australia
Recipients of the Centenary Medal